Walker is a populated place situated in Yavapai County, Arizona, United States.

History
The settlement was named after 19th-century mountain man Joseph R. Walker. 

Walker's population was 200 in 1890, and 39 in 1920.

References

External links
 
 
 Walker – ghosttowns.com

Populated places in Yavapai County, Arizona
Ghost towns in Arizona